The 1967–68 Chicago Black Hawks season was the Hawks' 42nd season in the NHL. The team was coming off their best regular season in team history. In 1966–67, Chicago finished in first place for the first time in club history with a franchise record 94 points.  The Black Hawks were then upset by the Toronto Maple Leafs in six games in the NHL semi-finals.

Off-season
There were many changes in the NHL during the off-season. Most notably the league doubled in size, as six expansion teams began play in the 1967–68 season.  The new teams added to the league were the California Seals (renamed to Oakland Seals in November), Los Angeles Kings, Minnesota North Stars, Philadelphia Flyers, Pittsburgh Penguins, and St. Louis Blues.  The league placed all of the expansion teams in the new West Division, while the Original Six teams made up a newly created East Division.  The NHL schedule also increased from 70 to 74 games.

The Black Hawks saw significant roster changes as they lost a number of players in the 1967 NHL Expansion Draft. The most noteworthy loss was goaltender Glenn Hall, left unprotected by the Hawks and drafted by the St. Louis Blues.  Chicago also made a blockbuster trade, sending Phil Esposito, Ken Hodge, and Fred Stanfield to the Boston Bruins for Pit Martin, Gilles Marotte, and Jack Norris.

Regular season
A six-game losing streak to start the season left the Black Hawks in last place. Chicago then rebounded, going 20–4–12 in their next 36 games.  Poor play late in the season left the team with a 32–26–16 mark, good for 80 points and the fourth and final playoff berth from the East Division. It was the team's ninth consecutive postseason appearance.

Stan Mikita led the Hawks offense. His 40 goals and 47 assists (a league-best 87 points) won him both the Art Ross Trophy and Hart Memorial Trophy for the second straight year.  Bobby Hull led the league in goals for the sixth time in his career, as he scored 44 times and earned 75 points.  Kenny Wharram had another very solid season, earning 69 points, while Doug Mohns finished with 53 points.  Pat Stapleton led the defense with 38 points, while Pierre Pilote finished just behind him with 37.  Newly acquired Gilles Marotte led the team in penalty minutes with 122.

Denis DeJordy saw most of the action in goal. Playing in 50 games, DeJordy recorded a career high 23 wins, along with a team best 2.71 GAA and four shutouts.

Season standings

Record vs. opponents

Game log

Playoffs
The Hawks would open the playoffs against the New York Rangers in the East Division semi-finals.  The Rangers finished the season with 90 points, which was 10 more than Chicago.  The series opened up with two games at Madison Square Garden in New York, and the Rangers took control of the series, winning both games for a 2–0 series lead.  The series moved to Chicago Stadium for the next two games, and the Hawks responded on their home ice, winning both games to even the series up.  The fifth game was played in New York, however, the Black Hawks held off the Rangers, winning the game 2–1, and took a 3–2 series lead.  Chicago would wrap up the series in the sixth game at home, easily defeating the Rangers 4–1, and advance to the East Division finals.

Chicago would face the Montreal Canadiens, with the winner advancing to the Stanley Cup final.  The Canadiens had the best record in the NHL, as they earned 94 points.  Montreal swept the Boston Bruins in their first playoff round.  The series began at the Montreal Forum, and the Canadiens quickly took a 2–0 series lead, as they dominated the Hawks in both games, winning 9–2 and 4–1.  The series moved to Chicago for the next two games, however, in the third game of the series, Montreal took a 3–0 series lead, doubling the Hawks 4–2 to put Chicago on the brink of elimination.  The Black Hawks staved off elimination in the fourth game, narrowly defeating Montreal 2–1, however, in the fifth game, played in Montreal, the Canadiens ended the series with an overtime winning goal, and advance to the Stanley Cup final.

Chicago Black Hawks 4, New York Rangers 2

Montreal Canadiens 4, Chicago Black Hawks 1

Player stats

Scoring leaders

Goaltending

Playoff stats

Scoring leaders

Goaltending

Draft picks
Chicago's draft picks at the 1967 NHL Amateur Draft held at the Queen Elizabeth Hotel in Montreal, Quebec.

References

Sources
Hockey-Reference
Rauzulu's Street
Goalies Archive
HockeyDB
National Hockey League Guide & Record Book 2007

Chicago Blackhawks seasons
Chicago
Chicago